George Andrew Leslie (born 21 November 1936) is a Scottish National Party politician and a veterinary surgeon. He was the SNP's Senior Vice-Chairman 1969–1971.

Early life
Leslie was born in Glasgow, Scotland. He studied at Hillhead High School and Glasgow University before becoming a vet.

Political career
He joined the Scottish National Party (SNP) in the early-1960s. He was selected to stand for the party at the 1967 Glasgow Pollok by-election.  During the by-election, one observer described his speeches as being in the style of Jimmy Maxton.  His campaign also featured the singing of both traditional and topical Scottish songs.  Although the party had never previously contested the seat, Leslie took 28% of the vote.  The Labour Party share of the vote dropped considerably, enabling the Conservative Party to win – their last by-election win of the twentieth century in Scotland. Leslie's campaign marked the start of a year of successes for the SNP, including becoming the largest party in local government in Stirling, and victory in the Hamilton by-election.

Leslie was soon elected to the Glasgow Corporation, and, in June 1969, became the SNP's Senior Vice-Chairman.  Later, he served as a Strathclyde Regional councillor for
East Kilbride, and he stood as the SNP candidate for Glasgow at the European Parliament election in 1979, taking 16.4% of the vote.

During the early-1980s, Leslie was the SNP's vice-chairman for policy.  He was the party's candidate in the high-profile Glasgow Hillhead by-election in 1982 but, despite campaigning hard, he finished in fourth place, with 11.3% of the votes cast.  He stood again in the Hillhead constituency at the 1983 general election, but only received 5.4% of the vote,  He stood in Strathclyde East at the 1984 European election, taking second place with 17.6% of the vote, then in Kilmarnock and Loudoun in the 1987 general election, taking third place but with 18.2% of the vote.  Standing again in Strathclyde East at the 1989 European election, he increased his share to 25.2%, and finally at the 1992 general election he took 15.6% and fourth place in Glasgow Pollok.

On 28 February 2010, Leslie formally launched a campaign to contest Kilmarnock and Loudoun at the 2010 general election. However, he finished in second place, 12,378 votes behind the Labour Party candidate Cathy Jamieson.

Leslie currently remains an active member of the SNP in the Kilmarnock and Loudoun area.

References

1936 births
Living people
Alumni of the University of Glasgow
Councillors in Glasgow
Scottish National Party councillors
People educated at Hillhead High School